Since the mid-1970s, California has had thriving regional punk rock movements. It primarily consists of bands from the Los Angeles, Orange County, Ventura County, San Diego, San Fernando Valley, San Francisco, Fresno, Bakersfield, Alameda County, Sacramento, Lake Tahoe, Oakland and Berkeley areas.

History

Pre-1976
Los Angeles had a very strong glam rock scene in the early 1970s, mostly centered on the club Rodney Bingenheimer's English Disco, run by Rodney Bingenheimer, who later, as a disc jockey for KROQ's Rodney on the ROQ, did much to promote LA punk bands. Many figures from this earlier scene would play notable roles in the later punk scene.

In the mid-1970s from 1974 to 1975 a wave of proto-punk bands emerged from Los Angeles, including the Flyboys and Atomic Kid.

The Runaways, an all female teenaged band featuring Joan Jett, managed by Kim Fowley, formed in Los Angeles in 1975, and combined elements of glam rock, hard rock, and early punk rock. The group would become one of the first punk or punk-adjacent bands to release recordings, with their self-titled debut LP and its single Cherry Bomb the next year.

1976–1979
Starting in 1976, following recent releases of recordings by punk bands such as the Ramones, a number of punk bands formed in the Los Angeles and Orange County area. Among these bands were the Dils (originally from Carlsbad), the Zeros (originally from Chula Vista), the Weirdos, the Screamers, Germs, the Dickies, Bags, X, and the Go-Go's. Many bands also formed in the San Francisco Bay, including The Nuns, Crime, Avengers, The Mutants, Negative Trend, The Offs and Dead Kennedys. California punk of this period was musically very eclectic, and the punk scene of the time included a number of bands whose sound crossed over to art/experimental punk, new wave, electropunk, punk-funk, rockabilly, deathrock and hard rock.

Emergence of hardcore punk

In 1978 in Southern California, the first hardcore punk bands arose, including Middle Class, Black Flag, Vicious Circle, Fear, and the Circle Jerks. Hardcore bands and fans tended to be younger than the art punks of the older LA scene and came mainly from the suburban parts of the Los Angeles area, especially the South Bay and Orange County. This resulted in a rivalry between the older artsy "Hollywood" scene and the hardcore "suburban", "surf punk", or "beach punk" scene. Those in the "Hollywood" scene often disliked what they saw as the musical narrowness of hardcore and the violence associated with "suburban" punks (the South Bay and Orange County punk scenes had a particular reputation for violence), while the "suburban" punks looked down on what they perceived as the lack of intensity of older "Hollywood" bands (the Germs being a notable exception with lead singer Darby Crash) and the fashion consciousness of "Hollywood" punks. The Penelope Spheeris documentary The Decline of Western Civilization, shot in early 1979 and early 1980, documents the period when the older LA punk scene was being completely taken over by hardcore and features performances by bands from both scenes. Decline was filmed in part at punk shows sponsored and promoted by David Ferguson, who in 1979, formed CD Presents, a recording label that would record and promote a number of pioneering groups from the California punk scene. Ferguson and CD Presents organized New Wave 1980, the first festival gathering and showcasing punk bands from all over the West Coast.

By 1979, hardcore had displaced the Hollywood scene and become the dominant expression called hardcore punk in both Northern and Southern California. By this time, many of the older punk bands had broken up or become relatively inactive. A few, such as X and The Go-Go's, went on to mainstream success as punk or new wave bands.

1980–1984
In the early 1980s in California, hardcore was the dominant form of punk and aggressive music. Notable hardcore bands active in that period included the Circle Jerks, Black Flag, the Adolescents, Minutemen, Descendents, T.S.O.L., China White, Agent Orange, the Vandals, Love Canal, Wasted Youth, Social Distortion, D.I., White Mice, Channel 3 (band), Dr. Know, the Mentors and NOFX in Southern California, and the Dead Kennedys, Flipper, MDC, and Verbal Abuse in the San Francisco Bay Area.

Though hardcore became dominant during this period, punk also began to diversify. Agent Orange had a noticeable hardcore party surf rock influence, while the Angry Samoans were strongly influenced by 1960s garage rock. Other bands such as the Joneses and Tex and the Horseheads became popular by playing a form of punk rock influenced by simple rock n roll without the ultra-fast beat of some of the hardcore bands.

Black Flag, T.S.O.L., Fear, D.I., the Adolescents, Detours, China White, Suicidal Tendencies, D.R.I. and others influenced later metal bands like Anthrax, Slayer and Metallica. These hardcore bands also created a crossover sound. The genre of thrash and early metalcore grew out of this fusion.

The hardcore scene, particularly in Los Angeles and Orange County, gained a reputation for violence due to the formation of several hardcore punk gangs. Reputed violence at punk concerts was featured in episodes of the popular television shows CHiPs and Quincy, M.E., in which Los Angeles hardcore punks were depicted as being involved in murder and mayhem. In the early 1980s, punk concerts increasingly became sites of violent battles between police and concertgoers, particularly in Los Angeles, but also in San Francisco. Henry Rollins argued that in his experience, the police caused far more problems than they solved at punk performances. At one point, Black Flag was under heavy surveillance by police convinced that the band was the cover for a drug ring.

Cities like Sacramento, Lake Tahoe and neighboring Reno, Nevada followed San Francisco and Los Angeles, creating their own underground hardcore scenes. Local promoter Stuart Katz brought punk rock to Sacramento in the early 1980s starting off with shows in auditoriums at McKinley Park. Katz eventually opened Club Minimal in South Sacramento, booking early hardcore acts such as Black Flag, Circle Jerks, Flipper, Crucifix as well as local bands. The police department shut down the club, but Katz led a 60s style peaceful protest inside the lobby of City Hall, joined by more than a hundred punk rockers. The protest made the cover page of the Sacramento Union.

Nardcore 

Nardcore is a hardcore punk movement that originated in the Oxnard suburbs of Silver Strand Beach and Port Hueneme. Early bands of the nardcore scene include Agression, Dr. Know, False Confession, Ill Repute, Habeas Corpus, Stalag 13, RKL and Scared Straight.

Around 1977, the first group in the area was a Moorpark band called the Rotters, emulating the new sounds of English punk rock. After playing a few parties for high school age audiences, Agression latched onto the style. The younger, future members of Dr. Know and Ill Repute were in the audiences saying "Oh, we can do that."

The first venues to regularly host punk shows in the Oxnard area were Casa Tropical (a Quonset hut at the Oxnard Airport), Town and Country (Port Hueneme), Skate Palace (Port Hueneme), and Casa de la Raza (Santa Barbara).

The local Skate Scene played heavily in the scene, many people riding in backyard half pipes or breaking into backyards with empty pools to skate. "We were all skaters before we were punkers," said Brandon Cruz, singer for several Nardcore bands.

There was and still is a strong sense of unity and community among the generations of Nardcore bands. Some unity came from the coverage by a local publication called 60 Miles North, which began in 1983 initially as a xeroxed flyer for an Alley Cats concert in nearby Camarillo. Ill Repute singer John Phaneuf says "Goldenvoice played a big role in getting the Oxnard scene big in L.A."

Much of the early promotion of nardcore was due to Mystic Records, in Hollywood, California, and its founder Doug Moody, and promotion director, Mark Wilkins. Mystic launched many bands onto vinyl which helped them form relationships with the music industry.

Nardcore origins
By combining the words "Oxnard" and "hardcore", the name is a reference to the Oxnard, California hardcore punk scene. Brandon Cruz credits Dr. Know guitarist Ismael Hernandez as the originator of the term. This coastal suburban community, sixty miles north-west of Los Angeles, California, was the spawning ground for many hardcore punk bands of the early 1980s and became a hotbed for punk and skate bands. Their collective sound became known as "Nardcore." Nardcore was popularized by the bands themselves, with a little help from Mystic records, Doug Moody and Mystic Promotion Director Mystic Mark Wilkins over a series of Vinyl Releases in the early 1980s. Nardcore tends to have a lot of the same characteristics as skate punk; however, it has a sound closer to traditional hardcore punk. A congealing of the style was the eponymous compilation LP release in 1984.

1984–1992
By the mid-1980s, many major punk acts such as Black Flag and Dead Kennedys, had broken up. Other bands that had remained such as T.S.O.L. and Circle Jerks began to change their sound in favor of more hard rock or metallic directions while other bands such as D.I., Agent Orange and the Adolescents continued on with their standard Punk Rock sound and released new material throughout the mid-1980s and 1990s. In 1985, Bad Religion reemerged from a hiatus and returned to Punk Rock with their 2nd EP, Back to the Known, featuring a sound that would later be continued and expanded on with albums like Suffer and No Control. During this time period a new generation of bands emerged, influenced by their early 80s predecessors. This new scene would produce bands such as ALL, Chemical People, Guttermouth, Urban Scum, Jughead's Revenge, Lagwagon, the Offspring, Pennywise, Face to Face, and Big Drill Car, and in San Francisco, No Use for a Name, Jawbreaker, the Lookouts, and the Swingin' Utters.

In the late 1980s and early 1990s, San Diego was home to a burgeoning post-hardcore scene centered on bands like Pitchfork, Rocket From the Crypt, the Renegades and Unwritten Law. Several of these bands played important roles in the so-called math rock movement.

The Bay Area punk scene began to flourish in the late 1980s. In 1987, Matt Freeman and Tim Armstrong (future members of Rancid) started ska-punk band Operation Ivy. Other Bay Area bands were Mr. T Experience, Isocracy, Samiam, and Crimpshrine. Over the next 20 years the Bay Area punk scene formed such influential punk bands such as Swingin Utters, Rancid, One Man Army, the Forgotten, AFI on record labels such as Sympathy for the Record Industry and Dead to Me.

While many of the second wave bands still retained the speed and anger of the first wave bands, others focused on a more melodic Ramones approach featuring lighthearted lyrics about relationships and other non-political situations.

In the early to mid-1990s, bands like Bad Religion, Social Distortion and the Offspring achieved large-scale success, being played on MTV as well as mainstream radio. Up until that point, only alternative format FM stations like KROQ 106.7 in Los Angeles, KWOD 106.5 in Sacramento, 91X in San Diego, Live 105 in San Francisco and Channel 92.3 in San Jose, as well as local public and college radio stations such as KDVS 90.3 in Davis played punk music.

1993–present
In 1989, Social Distortion signed with Epic Records becoming the first band from the scene, since the Dickies in the late 1970s, to get a major label deal. Their album, simply titled Social Distortion became a minor hit with four singles "Let It Be Me", "Ball and Chain", "Story of My Life" and a cover of Johnny Cash's "Ring of Fire" all charting on the Modern Rock Tracks top 25. In 1993, following the success of Social Distortion, Bad Religion were signed to Atlantic Records and reissued then-current album Recipe for Hate for the label that same year. Unlike Social Distortion however, Recipe for Hate initially received mixed reviews from music critics but brought the band a little success, peaking at #14 on Billboard's Heatseekers chart.

Also in 1993, Green Day signed a deal with Reprise Records and released their first major label album Dookie in 1994. Dookie became a huge success, peaking at #2 on the Billboard top 200 album chart and selling over 20,000,000 albums worldwide, and over 10,000,000 in the first year alone. Shortly after the success of Dookie, the Offspring's album Smash achieved similar results selling over 16,000,000 albums. However Smash unlike Dookie, was released by independent punk label Epitaph Records, and paved the way for other independent punk bands to achieve success. Formed in 1992, skate punk trio Blink-182 after having spent the next two years recording in DIY fashion two splits and three demos, including the commercially available Buddha before signing to independent label Cargo in 1994. They released their debut album Cheshire Cat in Cargo imprint Grilled Cheese in February 1995. The record, and heavy touring in support, helped the band gain a following in and out of the San Diego local punk scene and subsequently Australia. After opening for bigger bands in the scene like Pennywise and NOFX, Fletcher Dragge, who strongly believed in the trio, convinced Warped Tour founder Kevin Lyman to bring them on the next line up. They put out one EP They Came To Conquer... Uranus in 1996, and entered the studio after completing last tour obligations to record their second LP Dude Ranch, released in June 1997 to moderate success. It gave the band their first hit single, "Dammit". Two years later the album was certified platinum with one million copies sold.

Soon thereafter, Green Day and the Offspring were joined by Bad Religion, NOFX, and Rancid, whose respective albums Stranger Than Fiction, Punk in Drublic, and ...And Out Come the Wolves, were all certified Gold or Platinum (with the first being released on Atlantic and last two on Epitaph). Also during this period, ALL, Face to Face and a reunited Circle Jerks were all signed to major labels, Interscope, A&M and Mercury respectively. The success of these bands also led to success for Southern California ska punk bands like No Doubt, Sublime, Reel Big Fish, Goldfinger, as well as Northern California ska punk outfits like Smash Mouth. In June 1999, Blink-182 released their seminal album Enema of the State, now with a new drummer in Travis Barker, catapultating the trio into mainstream success and spearheading a second wave of pop punk, having an immediate impact on the scene.

Current nardcore

As of 2019, there are a handful of bands that play punk rock music that hail from Oxnard and surrounding areas: Bare Minimum, Bootleg Brigade, Civil Conflict, Crazy D & the Nutz, Dead Heat, Fred Fredburger, Malice Thoughts, Marron, Mullholand, Omega Point, Sordo, Violation of Probation and 3-Day Holocaust. As do many of the original Nardcore bands, Dr. Know, Ill Repute, False Confession, and Stalag 13. There has also been a revival of Nardcore as of late 2018 thanks to promoters such as Midnight Society Productions, Bangerz Only, Sleep Away, David Stalsworth (drummer of the above band, Civil Conflict), Ventura Pyrate Punx, Skip Nasty, and Casa Anarkia. The musical style has transcended the years, recently becoming a faster brand of punk. In the early years of Nardcore, there was a scene of localism with songs such as "Oxnar'd by Ill Repute and "Locals Only" by Agression. Nardcore music is now includes various musical sub-genres that all fall within the umbrella of punk: thrash metal, skate punk, surf punk (due to Ventura being a beach community), powerviolence, youth crew punk, hardcore and others. The music scene involves a large mix of people as Oxnard and surrounding areas are racially diverse. Band members are predominantly Hispanic of Mexican descent.

Marron has released two LP records. Sordo has various split cassette tape, as well as split vinyl releases with bands of the same genre.

Art
The proliferation of punk concerts and albums in California generated a like proliferation of flyer and album cover art. Some of the artists involved in producing art for the early punk scene later went on to greater notability. Mark Vallen, a painter and graphic artist, was associated with the early LA punk scene; his work was featured on a number of fanzine and album covers. Gary Panter was also closely associated with the early LA punk scene and produced the Screamers distinctive logo. Raymond Pettibon (brother of Greg Ginn of Black Flag) was similarly associated with the LA hardcore scene, especially Black Flag and the Minutemen, producing Black Flag's distinctive "four bars" logo. Winston Smith, a San Francisco collage artist, was associated with Dead Kennedys and also did a piece of artwork named "God Told Me to Skin You Alive" for Green Day's fourth album Insomniac.

Diverse punk rock artist and groups 

According to historian gaye Theresa Johnson the emergence of ethnic punk rock bands in Los Angeles was a result of double marginalization of individuals within the African-America and Latino communities during the late 1970s. She says some punk artists suggest that this double marginalization was necessary for these groups to develop the "D.I.Y." attitude associated with Punk Rock groups. These bands drew upon their working class experiences and sexual and racial identities in their music. Los Angeles' punk scene produced notable ethnic artist such as Alice Bag. Born Alicia Armendariz in 1958, Alice Bag, went on to become a member of punk rock groups Masque Era and the leader of the Bags. Bag was one of the few female leaders in the Punk Rock scene in the 1980s. Bag says one of the things that inspired her to join the punk rock scene was being rejected by the leaders of her high school's Brown Berets club. Bags says the organization didn't think she was serious about civil rights issues because of her appearance. Chicano and Chicana artist like Bag and Los Crudos challenged the idea that Punk Rock was an exclusively white genre by incorporating Spanish lyrics into their music. Bag continues to participate in the Punk Rock scene four decades after her debut, making her first solo track in 2016. Bag also continues to support the female punk rock scene in Los Angeles by interviewing and highlighting them on her website.

Queercore 
San Francisco and Los Angeles were major centers for both gay and punk subcultures, and there has long been crossover between them, with bands such as MDC featuring openly-gay frontpersons. When the queercore scene emerged in the early 1990s, California cities were major hubs of this emerging subculture. Pansy Division, a defining band in the queercore scene, hailed from San Francisco. In Los Angeles, Extra Fancy was one of the first post-alternative punk rock bands to be led by an openly gay individual, Brian Grillo. Grillo's intimidating look went against the stereotypical image of a gay male and was supposed to depict a radical homosexual enraged against machismo. Vaginal "Creme" Davis was an African American artist from Watts that emerged from the queercore scene in Los Angeles. Davis became well known for challenging the mainstream view of the gay community. He called it the "ultimate conformist culture" and said, "I never fit into the mainstream gay world and never will." Davis performed in drag and began a band with Alice Bags where its members dressed up as teenage Latinas.

Notable venues

Notable labels
While a few bands like Green Day, the Offspring, and AFI appear on major labels, many of the bands are signed to local independent punk labels. Many of these labels were started by local musicians as a way to sell their own bands' records, but grew into labels with a large roster of bands. Some of these labels include:

 Adeline Records – started by Pro Skater Jim Thiebaud, Green Day's Billie Joe Armstrong, and his wife Adrienne Armstrong.
 Alternative Tentacles – started by Dead Kennedys member Jello Biafra
 Asian Man Records – started by Skankin' Pickle's Mike Park
 BYO Records – started by Youth Brigade's Shawn and Mark Stern
 CD Presents Records - started by David Ferguson
 Dangerhouse Records – started by former Screamers member David Brown
 Epitaph Records – started by Bad Religion's Brett Gurewitz
 Fat Wreck Chords – started by NOFX's Fat Mike
 Fearless Records
 Frontier Records
 Sleep It Off Records – started by punk band Less Than Jake.
 Geykido Comet Records
 Gravity Records - started by Heroin
 Hellcat Records – started by Bad Religion's Brett Gurewitz and Rancid's Tim Armstrong
 Hopeless Records
 Kung Fu Records – started by the Vandals' Joe Escalante and Warren Fitzgerald
 Lookout! Records – started by the Lookouts frontman Larry Livermore
 Mordam Records
 Mystic Records
 New Alliance Records – started by the Minutemen
 Nitro Records – started by the Offspring's Dexter Holland and Greg K.
 Pure Noise Records
 Posh Boy Records
 Punkcore Records
 Slash Records – associated with the fanzine Slash
 Slap-a-Ham Records
 SST Records – started by Black Flag guitarist Greg Ginn
 Subterranean Records
 Sympathy for the Record Industry

Fanzines
 Cometbus
 Flipside
 Maximum RocknRoll
 Razorcake
 Slash

See also
 Music of California: Punk rock
 StreetArt: The Punk Poster in San Francisco 1977–1981

References

Further reading
 More Fun in the New World: The Unmaking and Legacy of L.A. Punk, ed. Tom DeSavia and John Doe (June 4, 2019). Hachette Books. 
 Ridge, Daniel. Real hardcore true punk. San Diego Reader. Oct 17, 2002.

External links
 Big Wheel Magazine, the last punk rock media outlet left in Los Angeles.
 L.A. Punk History, Punk Information Directory, archived from the original on April 4, 2016.
 SoCal Skankers, SoCal Punk Show Directory.
 "Hardcore Holocaust: LA Punk Report" by Glenn E. Friedman, Sounds, April 10, 1982. (Archived at Punk of the 20th Century Archives)
 Rock Photographer, Edward Colver's truly iconic photographic account is most notable.
 "Teenage Alcoholics: Punk Rock in East Los Angeles" by Jimmy Alvarado, Razorcake #3, August–September 2001 (updated for website January 2007). (Archived at Punk of the 20th Century Archives)
 Women in LA Punk, interviews by Alice Bag, AliceBag.com, 2006.
 "Punk Flyers from 1977 Los Angeles" by Mark Vallen, Art-for-a Change, 2006.
 Punk Zine Archive, Operationphoenixrecords.com – 1980s California punk 'zine online archive.
 "The Hollywood Binliner: LA Punk", by Mick Farren, NME, 1977, reprinted in Crawdaddy!, 2008.
 Photos of San Francisco Bands circa 1980
 "San Diego Punk", current news on the San Diego music scene and a 10-year archive.
 "San Diego Punk Archive", curated by Margaret Nee

Music scenes
California
Music of California